Setsurō, Setsuro or Setsurou (written: 節郎 or 節朗) is a masculine Japanese given name. Notable people with the name include:

, Japanese physiologist
, Japanese film director

Japanese masculine given names